Dot and the Bunny is a 1983 Australian animated film. It serves as a direct sequel to the 1977 film Dot and the Kangaroo.

Plot
Dot ventures out into the bush, determined to finally locate the little lost joey and reunite him with his mother. On her way, she meets a silly bunny rabbit who tries to convince Dot that he is the joey she is looking for. Dot is delighted by his antics and names her new companion 'Funny Bunny'. Together they continue the search for the joey. On the way, Dot learns that Funny Bunny is really a very lonely rabbit. His family was killed by hunters, and he has been on his own ever since. They find mother kangaroo, and though she has not yet found her joey, when she sees the lonely bunny she realizes she has found someone else to look after.

Cast
 Barbara Frawley — Dot
 Robyn Moore — Funnybunny
 Drew Forsythe — Koala
 Ron Haddrick
 Anne Haddy
 Ross Higgins
 Anna Quin — The Girl (live-action segment)

References

External links
 Dot and the Bunny at  IMDb

1983 animated films
1983 films
1980s Australian animated films
1980s children's animated films
1980s musical films
Animated films about koalas
Animated films about orphans
Animated films about rabbits and hares
Animated films about wombats
Australian animated feature films
Australian children's adventure films
Australian children's musical films
Films directed by Yoram Gross
Films with live action and animation
1980s English-language films
1980s Australian films
Flying Bark Productions films